The North Korea national football team (Munhwaeo , recognized as Korea DPR by FIFA) represents North Korea in men's international football and it is controlled by the DPR Korea Football Association, the governing body for Football in North Korea. The team represents both FIFA and Asian Football Confederation (AFC).

In their 1966 World Cup debut, North Korea reached the quarter-finals and beat Italy in the group stage becoming the first men's Asian team in history to make it past the group stage. During the 2006 World Cup Qualifiers, controversy arose when the team's supporters rioted, interfering with the opponents' safe egress from the stadium, because of North Korea's failure to qualify. In 2009, the team qualified for the 2010 FIFA World Cup, the second World Cup appearance in their history. North Korea has qualified for the AFC Asian Cup five times; in 1980, when they finished fourth, in 1992, 2011, in 2015, and in 2019. The current team is composed of both native North Koreans and Japanese-born Chongryon-affiliated Koreans.

History

North Korea's debut and the 1966 World Cup 
The North Korea Football Association was founded in 1945. It became a member of the AFC during the confederation's first year of existence in 1954, and has been affiliated with FIFA since 1958. The first official match of the North Korean national football team was played on 22 March 1964 in Rangoon, against Burma, as part of the 1964 Olympic qualifiers. This first match in the history of the North Korean selection ended in a goalless draw. Thanks to their victory over the Burmese in the second leg, the Chollimas reached the next round against Thailand, a two-legged affair also hosted in Rangoon. They won easily (7–0 over the two matches), but were forced to forfeit the final phase of the tournament because the IOC decided to ban any athlete who participated in the GANEFO—which several footballers from the national team did. 

In 1965, the national team took part again in GANEFO, and in 1966 World Cup qualification for the first time. That year, FIFA decided to place all the selections entered from Africa, Asia and Oceania in a single qualifying group, with the aim of offering only one place. All registered African countries protested by withdrawing from the competition, leaving only North Korea and Australia. The Australians started as favourites, but the North Koreans, showing coordination and great discipline, won both matches (6–1 and 3–1) and qualified for the final phase. The qualification of North Korea posed a diplomatic problem for the organizing country, the United Kingdom; since the Korean War, they had not recognized the legitimacy of the Pyongyang government and would not fly its flag or play its national anthem. The problem was only partly solved before the start of the competition in July 1966; the North Korean flag was flown alongside those of the other participants, but the national anthem was not played before the matches of the Chollimas.

In the 1966 FIFA World Cup, they were drawn into group 4, along with the USSR, Italy and Chile, the first time North Korea would face teams from another continent. The Chollimas lost their first game against the Soviets, then managed a 1–1 draw against Chile (Pak Seung-zin scoring North Korea's first goal at a World Cup). The last match, against the Italian double world champions, was crucial, as the winner would obtain their ticket to the quarter-finals. The quasi-military discipline of Myung Rye-hyun's men manages to secure them a 1–0 win with a goal from Pak Doo-ik, against the Italians (who received tomatoes on their return to the country). This success allowed an Asian team to qualify for the quarter-finals of a World Cup for the first time. At the same time, the public began to take an interest in these disciplined players from a closed country. They were cheered on by locals in the town of Middlesbrough, where they were housed, including the team's star players, Pak Seung-zin and Pak Doo-ik. In the quarter-finals, North Korea faced Portugal. After 25 minutes of play, the Koreans led 3–0 (goals from Pak Seung-zin, Yang Seung-kook and Li Dong-woon) but began to lose their discipline. Eusébio went on to score four goals with another goal scored by José Augusto. North Korea lost the match 5–3. When the North Korean players returned home, the crowd cheered them on as heroes. Pak Seung-zin is North Korea's top scorer in the FIFA World Cup with two goals in four games.

Thirty-five years later, British director Dan Gordon, made a film called The Game of Their Lives after finding the seven surviving players of the 1966 side, who had become favourites with the British public and were celebrated as heroes on their return to their country. The film screened in North Korea and South Korea and received the award for Best Sports Documentary from the Royal Television Society.

After the World Cup (1967–1980) 

Following the World Cup, the selection of North Korea only rarely took part in the qualifying campaigns for the various continental and world tournaments. The Chollimas forfeited the 1968 Olympic qualifiers, and failed to enter the 1968 AFC Asian Cup qualification and 1970 World Cup qualifiers when they refused to face the Israeli selection in the second round of the playoffs. Between their World Cup quarter-final and 1971, they played only one friendly against Algeria, losing 3–1 in Algiers. This meeting is also the first in the history of the team against an African team.

The North Koreans played their first official game since 1966 in 1972, as part 1972 Olympic qualifiers. They faced Syria, whom they eliminated, before disposing of Iraq, but ended up losing against Iran (2–0) in a play-off match, following two 0–0 draws in the first two legs. They decided again not to register for the 1972 AFC Asian Cup qualifiers. In May 1973, Pak Seung-zin's men were in Tehran to play the first phase of the 1974 World Cup qualifiers. They were in Group 2, along with host nation Iran, Syria and Kuwait. The results are disappointing with a third place in the group, behind the Iranians, qualified for the rest of the competition, and Syria.

North Korea took part in 1976 AFC Asian Cup qualification for the first time. Placed in group 4-B, with Japan and Singapore, the Chollimas finished first then beat Hong Kong in the semi-finals, ensuring their participation in the tournament at the same time, then beating China in the final match. But, like Saudi Arabia and Thailand, the North Koreans withdrew and missed the opportunity to take part in the continental tournament for the first time.

The following year, under the direction of its former striker Pak Doo-ik, the team qualified for the second time in its history for the Olympic football tournament. They finished first during qualification and advanced following a penalty shootout against the Indonesia. In Montreal, they were placed in Group 3 with the host country and the USSR. The North Koreans beat Canada 3–1, then lost to the Soviets 0–3, but still qualified for the quarter-finals in second. They failed again at this stage of the competition, falling heavily against future silver medalist team Poland 5–0. They play the last half hour with ten men against the Polish selection led by Grzegorz Lato and Andrzej Szarmach, who each scored twice.

The following two qualifying campaigns, for the 1978 World Cup and for the 1980 Olympics, were failures. The former was cut short with a withdrawal for diplomatic reasons, the North Koreans finding themselves in the same qualifying group as their southern neighbors, and in 1980, the Chollimas finished in 4th place in Group 3 of the pre-tournament, overtaken by Iran, Singapore and China.

In 1980, this time with Yang Seung-kook on the bench, the North Koreans took part in 1980 AFC Asian Cup qualification which saw successes against Thailand and Malaysia. They finished in second place in Group 1 of the 1980 AFC Asian Cup, behind Iran, the defending champions. In the semi-finals, it is an event that is of both sporting and political significance since it is against South Korea. After opening the scoring very early, North Korea conceded two goals by Chung Hae-won in the last ten minutes and saw their journey come to an end in the semi-final, their best performance in the Asian Cup of Nations. The game for third place was a disaster, with a 3–0 defeat against Iran.

From one Asian Cup to another (1981–1992) 

In 1980, with former international Han Bong-zin on the bench, the North Koreans moved on to 1982 World Cup qualification. After finishing top of their group (ahead of Hong Kong and Singapore), they eliminated Japan in the semi-finals but lost to China in the group final, ending any hopes of qualification. The following year, the selection participated in the 1982 Asian Games. North Korean progressed through the first round (drawing against Syria and Saudi Arabia and victory against Thailand), then beat Japan in the quarter-finals. They lost in extra time in the semi-finals, against Kuwait. The end of the match was extremely turbulent as the North Korean players attacked Thai referee Vijit Getkaew. The penalties from the AFC were heavy with a two-year suspension, which began as soon as the match ended, therefore they did not even play the match for the bronze medal, which automatically went to Saudi Arabia, the other unfortunate semi-finalists. The immediate consequence of this decision by the AFC, was the disqualification of North Korea from the 1984 AFC Asian Cup qualifiers and from the 1984 Olympic qualifiers which were boycotted by North Korea.

The selection therefore spent almost four years without playing official matches. For the 1986 World Cup qualifiers, they entered Group 4 alongside Japan and Singapore, two nations they had beaten four years previously. This time, it was the Japanese, led by Hiromi Hara who finished top of the group and continued their qualifying campaign.

In 1988, North Korea did not participate in the 1988 Olympic tournament. North Korea had initially asked to be involved in the Games, a request refused by the International Olympic Committee, resulting in their boycott of the Games. As for the 1988 AFC Asian Cup qualification, North Korea only placed third in their qualifying group, behind Syria and Iran, both of which qualified for the Qatari tournament.

In 1990, North Korea took part in the inaugural 1990 Dynasty Cup. North Korea finished in third place. The following year, in the 1990 World Cup qualifiers, North Korea finished top of their first-round pool, winning all three of their home matches. In the final round, North Korea finished last, winning only one game, against Qatar.

Two years later, in 1991, the federation took a historic decision as it hired a foreign manager for the first time, Hungarian Pál Csernai, the former coach of Bayern Munich. North Korea finished the 1992 AFC Asian Cup qualification in first, ahead of Macao, Hong Kong and Taiwan. It thus qualified for the second time in its history for the Asian Cup, twelve years after its successful debut in Kuwait. Csernai's team were drawn into Group 1, along with hosts Japan, Iran and the United Arab Emirates. This time, their tournament ended in the first round, finishing without a win and with only two goals scored (both by Kim Kwang-min).

North Korea entered 1992 Olympic qualifiers, after two consecutive withdrawals. Placed in Group E, Pyongyang was chosen, along with Beijing, to host the qualifying matches. Once again, the final tournament escaped them, finishing in second place, behind China and ahead of Singapore, the Maldives and Nepal. Right after the Games, the selection takes part in the 1992 Dynasty Cup. Like two years before, the team finished on the third step of the podium, behind Japan and South Korea, who faced each other in the final.

Withdrawal period (1993–2005) 

Invigorated by their participation in the final phase of the 1992 Asian Cup, Csernai's men attacked the qualification for the 1994 FIFA World Cup full of hope. Placed into Group C, North Korea finished undefeated, ahead of Qatar, Singapore, Indonesia and Vietnam. The next round took the form of a single pool bringing together the six winners of the first round and the matches are once again held in Doha. Unfortunately for the North Koreans, after an inaugural victory against Iraq (3–2), they suffered four defeats in a row. The disappointment was immense, both for the Hungarian coach, who left his post after the last meeting and left for Europe without returning to Pyongyang, and the federation put the national team on hold for more than four years. During this period, when North Korea tumbled in the ranking established by FIFA, they choose not to register for any competition. This period of withdrawal coincided with the North Korean famine (1994–1998), causing hundreds of thousands of deaths. It also coincided with the official three-year mourning following the death of President Kim Il-sung in 1994, and the accession to power of his son Kim Jong-il.

North Korea made their return to an official game in 2000 AFC Asian Cup qualification. Placed into Group 8 along with Thailand, Malaysia and Taiwan, Myong Dong-chan's men are only beaten by the Thais, and booked their ticket for the final tournament. They continue with the 2000 Olympic qualification but they finished second in their group, failing to advance. Following this, the federation again decided to sideline the team, withdrawing it from the qualifiers for the 2002 World Cup and for the 2003 EAFC.

In 2003, it was with Yun Jong-su on the bench that the North Koreans started the 2004 AFC Asian Cup qualification. After a preliminary round where they dismissed the Indian team (2–0 and 1–1), the Chollimas can not do better than a last place the second round. These playoffs are marked by two incidents: first, during the game against Iran, where the North Koreans left the field as a result of smoke bombs which have landed on the field, the second as North Korea refused to issue the Jordanian players visas, leading to the AFC granting Jordan a 3–0 victory and suspending North Korea from all competition in Asia for a year including the 2007 AFC Asian Cup.

In 2005, the North Koreans returned to the 2006 World Cup qualifiers, twelve years after their last campaign. Dropped into Group 5 in the second round, they finished top. In the next round, they saw their journey come to an end finishing last behind Japan, Iran (both qualified for the final phase) and Bahrain (which had to play in the play-off). A few months later, North Korea return to the 2005 East Asian Football Championship, thirteen years after their last participation. In the qualifying round, the North Koreans broke their record for biggest victory with a 21–0 victory against Guam. As in the 1990 and 1992 editions, the Chollimas finished on the podium, in third place, behind China and Japan, whom they beat 1–0 in the first match of the final round.

First title and return to the World Cup (2006–2010) 

The sanction imposed by the AFC on North Korea deprived it of participation in the qualifications for the 2007 AFC Asian Cup. With coach Kim Jong-hun at its head, the selection entered the 2008 AFC Challenge Cup, a competition reserved for so-called developing nations by the AFC and whose winner obtained direct qualification for the 2011 AFC Asian Cup. The North Korean selection had a good run which ended on the third step of the podium, after a defeat in the semi-finals against Tajikistan then a big success (4–0) in the third-placed match against Myanmar.

In the 2010 World Cup qualifiers, the Chollimas easily dismissed Mongolia (4-1 and 5-1) then advanced in second place behind the South Korea, without any defeats or even conceding a goal. North Korea again finished second, again behind South Korea and obtained their qualification for the final phase of the World Cup, forty-four years after 1966. During these qualifiers there were diplomatic incidents with South Korea after Kim Jong-Il refused to have the South Korean national anthem played, or even to fly the flag in the country, the two meetings against the Taeguk Warriors had to be relocated to China. At the end of the year, the North Koreans managed to qualify for the 2008 East Asian Football Championship, after beating Hong Kong. During this four-man final phase played in Chongqing, China, they finished last, with two draws (against Japan and South Korea, who won the tournament, and a defeat against China).

To prepare for the World Cup and get used to the European style of play, the North Korean selection organized a preparation camp in the fall of 2009 in France, 44 years after its last appearance in Europe. On this occasion, they played two friendly matches: against FC Nantes on October 9 at La Roche-sur-Yon (0-0) then against Congo on October 13 at Le Mans (0-0). In early 2010, a few months before the World Cup, North Korea participated in the 2010 AFC Challenge Cup with the winner automatically qualifying for the final phase of the 2011 AFC Asian Cup. The Chollimas, still led by Kim Jong-hun, had an excellent run in the competition. After finishing top of their first round group, ahead of Turkmenistan, they swept Burma 5–0 in the semi-finals before winning, after the penalty shootout, again facing the Turkmens in the final. This success allowed them to secure a place in the continental finals, ten years after their last participation. It was also the first title obtained by the men's national team. The following month, in February, the North Koreans engaged in the 2010 East Asian Football Championship where they entered in the second round. For the first time, they did not reach the final pool, beaten on goal difference by Hong Kong.

In the 2010 FIFA World Cup, during their match with Brazil, North Korea lost 1-2 but managed to score a goal, through Ji Yun-nam at the very end of the match. Their match against Portugal ended in a 7-0 defeat, the heaviest in the history of the selection. After trailing 1-0 at halftime, they conceded six goals in the second half. This match also marked the elimination of the North Koreans from the World Cup. This match was exceptionally broadcast in North Korea, as no foreign program is usually broadcast by state television, but the broadcast was interrupted when the North Korean players were losing 4–0. The last meeting against Côte d'Ivoire also ended in a heavy defeat with the score of 3–0.

Successes and difficult times (since 2011) 

Six months after the World Cup, the Chollimas entered the 2011 AFC Asian Cup. The team managed to draw 0–0 against the United Arab Emirates and two 1–0 defeats against Iran and Iraq. In the fall, the North Koreans entered the 2014 World Cup qualifiers, with the hope of participating in a second consecutive tournament. They did not enter the competition until the third round, finding themselves in the same group as Japan, Uzbekistan and Tajikistan (which benefited from the disqualification of Syria). The Chollimas finished in 3rd place of the group. The round featured the first meeting of the Japanese team and their North Korean counterparts in Pyongyang in 22 years. 150 Japanese supporters were allowed to be present but they received four-hour checks upon their arrival at Pyongyang International Airport, an "icy" reception at Kim Il-sung Stadium, where they were warned not to wave Japanese flags, and had their national anthem booed by the North Korean crowd.

In March 2012, the North Koreans defended the 2012 AFC Challenge Cup with the possibility again to qualify for the 2015 AFC Asian Cup. The Chollimas advance to the finals after finishing top of their qualifying group, along with Nepal. In the semi-finals, they beat Palestine and then managed to retain their title, following their success in the final against Turkmenistan. This victory assured them of a second consecutive participation in the AFC Asian Cup, which was a first.

The team enjoyed a two-year unbeaten run, after the home defeat against Uzbekistan in the 2014 World Cup qualifiers.The Chollimas played in the second round of the 2013 EAFF East Asian Cup but failed to advance on goal difference, coming second to Australia. In November 2013, the unbeaten streak ended with a loss to Kuwait (2–1). They managed to finish first in the 2015 EAFF East Asian Cup qualifying pool, getting their ticket to the finals for the first time since 2008.

A few weeks before the start of the 2015 AFC Asian Cup, the North Korean federation relieved Yun Jong-su of his duties, following his suspension of one year decided by the AFC. Jong-su was penalized for his unsportsmanlike behaviour towards the referees during the Asian Games soccer tournament final against South Korea. North Korea left the competition at the end of the group stage, after losing their three matches. Following this competition, the team restored its image by winning several friendly matches before finishing on the podium of the 2015 EAFF East Asian Cup, including a prestigious victory over Japan (2–1).

In the 2018 World Cup qualifiers, North Korea got off to a flying start by winning their first three games, but failed to qualify for the 3rd round, following a defeat to the Philippines at the very end of the match (2–3, having led 2–1 until the 85th minute) during the final match. North Korea finished in second place in their group with 16 points, but this defeat prevented the Chollima from finishing among the four best runners-up and advancing to the next round. This led to the dismissal of Kim Chang-bok, replaced by Jørn Andersen, the second European coach to manage North Korea after the Hungarian Pál Csernai. The early elimination in World Cup qualifying meant that North Korea had to enter the 3rd qualifying round for the 2019 AFC Asian Cup. This qualifying campaign gave rise to a triple postponement by the AFC of the home match against Malaysia, at the request of the Malaysian Federation, fearing the poisoning of its players if they went to North Korea following diplomatic tensions between the two countries - linked to the assassination of Kim Jong-nam, the North Korean leader's half-brother, at Kuala Lumpur airport on 13 February 2017. The meetings between the two teams were finally held on neutral ground in Thailand, where North Korea needed two victories to give them a chance to qualify, dominating Malaysia (4–1 and 4–1). At the 2017 EAFF E-1 Football Championship, the Chollima failed to win a single match and finished 4th and last in the final round, with two opening losses against Japan and South Korea (0–1 each time) before ending the competition in a draw (1–1) against China.

In the 2019 AFC Asian Cup, the Chollima were swept away by Saudi Arabia (0–4), Qatar (6–0, suffering the second heaviest defeat in its history) and against Lebanon (1–4), leaving the competition with the worst record of the 24 teams involved (three defeats in as many games played, only one goal scored, 14 conceded, and two red cards received). North Korea then participated in the 2nd round of the 2022 World Cup qualifiers and beat Lebanon (2–0) thanks to a double from Jong Il-gwan. North Korea managed to follow up with a narrow victory in Sri Lanka five days later (1–0) with a goal by Jang Kuk-chol before facing South Korea. For the first time since a friendly match in 1990 and for the first time in a qualifier, the meeting between the two Koreas took place in Pyongyang, however the match was not televised live and no Korean supporters or foreign journalists were allowed to attend the match, which ended in a scoreless goal (0–0), leaving the two teams at the top of Pool H tied. Following the match against their rivals, they lost for the first time in their history against Turkmenistan (1–3) but managed to beat their Lebanese nemesis (2–0). Five days later, they played Lebanon again, drawing 0–0, preserving their chances of qualifying for the next round. However, the AFC announces North Korea's withdrawal from qualifying due to fears related to the COVID-19 pandemic. FIFA and the AFC decided that all results of matches played by North Korea since the start of the 2nd qualifying round and 2023 AFC Asian Cup are no longer counted for the classification of group. Consequently, North Korea will not play in the 2023 Asian Cup, their 4th consecutive final phase.

Kit providers

Since 2014, North Korea's official kit provider is currently produced by the North Korean sports company Choeusu.

Recent results and fixtures

Coaching staff

Coaching history
Caretaker managers are listed in italics.

 Kim Gun-nam (1964–1965)
 Myung Rye-hyun (1965–1966)
 Pak Doo-ik (1976, 1986–1989)
 Pak Du-sok (1978, 1982)
 Yang Song-guk (1980)
 Han Bong-zin (1980–1981))
 Jong Yong-song (1985)
 Pak Doo-ik (1986–1989)
 Kim Jong-min (1990)
 Myong Dong-chan (1990)
 Hong Hyon-chol (1991–1992)
 Yun Myong-chan (1992–1993)
 Pál Csernai (1993)
 An Se-uk (1998)
 Mun Ki-nam (1999–2000)
 Myong Dong-chan (2000)
 Ri Jong-man (2001–2003, 2006–2007)
 Yun Jong-su (2003–2005, 2011–2014, 2019–)
 Kim Myong-song (2005)
 Han Hyong-il (2005–2006)
 Kim Jong-hun (2007–2010)
 Jo Tong-sop (2008 and 2010)
 Jo Tong-sop and Cho In-chol (2010–2011)
 Jo Tong-sop (2014–2015)
 Kim Chang-bok (2015–2016)
 Jørn Andersen (2016–2018)
 Pak Yong-il (2018)
 Kim Yong-jun (2018–2019)

Notes

Players

Current squad

Recent call-ups
The following players have been called up to the North Korea squad within the last twelve months.

Records

Players in bold are still active with North Korea.

Competitive record

FIFA World Cup

AFC Asian Cup

Asian Games

AFC Challenge Cup

East Asian Cup

Dynasty Cup

All-time results
The following table shows North Korea's all-time international record, correct as of 1 January 2021.

 https://www.worldfootball.net/teams/nordkorea-team/21/
 FIFA.com

Honours

AFC
 Asian Games
 Champions (1): 1978
 AFC Challenge Cup
 Champions (2): 2010, 2012

Invitational
 Nehru Cup
 Champions (1): 1993
 Hero Intercontinental Cup
 Champions (1): 2019
 Qatar International Friendship Tournament
 Champions (1): 2010

VFF Vietnam International Friendly Cup
 Champions (1): 2010

See also

Football in North Korea
North Korea–South Korea football rivalry
The Game of Their Lives (2002 film)

References

External links

Blog about football Democratic People's Republic of Korea 
Korea DPR by FIFA, 15 June 2010
North Korea – The World Cup's Mystery Men by BBC News, 9 June 2010
The story of North Korea at the 1966 World Cup, BBC News, 15 June 2010
Video of Italy's shock loss to North Korea in the World Cup 1966 by Youtube.com, 15 June 2010
Northern Exposure: The People's Team Abroad by Soccerlens, 25 July 2010

 
Asian national association football teams
AFC Challenge Cup-winning countries